Skopje International Airport, also known as Skopje Airport, and Petrovec Airport and is the larger and busier of the two international airports in North Macedonia, with the other being the St. Paul the Apostle Airport in Ohrid, which is located  southwest from the national capital Skopje. The airport was previously named Skopje Alexander the Great Airport.

History

Early years
The airport was built in 1928. The first commercial flights in Skopje were introduced in 1929 when the Yugoslav carrier Aeroput introduced a route linking the city with the capital, Belgrade. A year later, the route was extended to Thessaloniki and further to Athens in 1933. In 1935, Aeroput linked Skopje with Bitola and Niš, and also operated a longer international route linking Vienna and Thessaloniki through Zagreb, Belgrade and Skopje.

After the Second World War, Aeroput was replaced by JAT Yugoslav Airlines, which linked Skopje to a number of domestic and international destinations until the dissolution of Yugoslavia in the early 1990s.

Development since the 2000s
In December 2006, the conservative VMRO-DPMNE-led government of the Republic of Macedonia renamed the airport after Alexander the Great, sparking further controversy in the ongoing diplomatic feud with Greece. Both countries consider Alexander the Great as part of their respective heritages, demonstrated by the fact that the regional airport of Kavala in Greek Macedonia is also named after Alexander. However, the airport in Kavala was the first to be named as such since 1992.

In 2008, the Macedonian Government signed a contract with the Turkish company Tepe Akfen Ventures (TAV) for a twenty-year-long concession, during which this company would manage Macedonia's two existing airports, the Skopje Airport and the St. Paul the Apostle Airport in Ohrid.

In September 2011, the new terminal building, extension of the runway, new administrative building, cargo building and new access road with parking facilities were opened.

In February 2018, Alexander the Great was dropped from the airport's name in a move to improve relations with Greece, with the airport being officially renamed Skopje International Airport. A few months before, Aegean Airlines announced future flights between Athens and Skopje, the first flights to Greece for several years, another example of improved relations between the two countries following the Prespa agreement.

Airlines and destinations

The following airlines operate regular scheduled and charter flights to and from Skopje:

Cargo

Statistics

Traffic development
The number of passengers has increased since 1990, from 312,492 passengers in that year, to 2,158,258 passengers in 2018, but this was not a steady increase. In 2000 the airport handled 1,005,852 passengers, but in 2001 the number of passengers dropped to 499,789. This was influenced in part by a number of airlines replacing services to Skopje with services to nearby. In 2014 Skopje airport handled 1,208,359 passengers, surpassing one million for the first time since 2000.

Busiest routes (2022)

Largest airlines (2022)

Largest country markets (2022)

Ground transportation
Taxis to Skopje are available. There is also a bus service linking the airport and the city with several stops.

Incidents and accidents
On 24 July 1992, an Antonov 12BK of Volga-Dnepr Airlines crashed at the mountainous Lisec village near Tetovo, on approach to Skopje Airport, after the crew strayed off course while trying to circumnavigate a thunderstorm, because the DME at Skopje Airport was inoperative. All 8 occupants died and the plane was written off.
On 5 March 1993, Palair Macedonian Airlines Flight 301, a Fokker 100 bound for Zurich, crashed seconds after takeoff from runway 34. Investigation into the accident determined the cause of the accident to be the failure of the flight crew to have the aircraft deiced before departure. Of the 97 people on board, 83 died.
On 12 January 2008, a Mil Mi-17 of the Macedonian Air Force, from Mostar en route to Skopje Airport, crashed on a hill near Katlanovsko Blato in dense fog and burned out. All 11 occupants died and the helicopter was written off.
On 13 February 2009, Austrian Airlines Flight OS780, Bombardier Dash 8 Q400 scheduled flight from Skopje to Vienna, failed to retract landing gear after take-off and performed an emergency landing on Skopje Airport.
On 14 November 2011, a private flight Socata TBM700N (TBM850), from Maastricht Aachen Airport to Skopje, hit several treetops and approach light while landing and missed the extended asphalt of the runway and touched down on grass. All five occupants escaped unharmed. The plane received substantial damage and was sent to Daher-Socata at Tarbes-Lourdes-Pyrénées Airport for repairs.
On 11 February 2012, Czech Airlines Flight 848, a Boeing 737-55S scheduled flight from Prague to Skopje, made an emergency landing at Skopje, because of reported smoke that came out of the aircraft. Airport firefighters and ambulance were alarmed. The plane had a minor damage and all passengers escaped uninjured.
On 6 September 2016, a private Piper PA-34-200T Seneca II crashed near Vetersko, Veles while landing in Skopje, killing all 6 on board. The aircraft was written off.

References

External links

Airports in North Macedonia
Airport
Petrovec Municipality